The Wallagaraugh River is a perennial river of the Genoa River catchment, with its headwaters located in the South Coast region of New South Wales and its lower reaches located in the East Gippsland region of Victoria, Australia.

Course and features
The river flows generally south, then east, and then south, crossing the Black-Allan Line that forms part of the border between Victoria and New South Wales, joined by eight minor tributaries and flowing through Nadgee Nature Reserve, before reaching its confluence with the Genoa River at Coleman Inlet, east of Genoa in Victoria. The river descends  over its  course.

North of the Black-Allan Line and within Nadgee State Forest, the Princes Highway crosses the river.

See also

 Croajingolong National Park
 List of rivers of New South Wales (L-Z)
 List of rivers of Australia
 Rivers of New South Wales

References

External links
 
 
 

East Gippsland catchment
Rivers of Gippsland (region)
Rivers of New South Wales
South Coast (New South Wales)